Slobodan "Boban" Savović (born November 27, 1979) is a Montenegrin former professional basketball player.

Early career
Raised in Serbia and Montenegro, Savović came to the United States in 1994 and played at East Side High School in Newark, New Jersey. In 1996, Savović represented Serbia and Montenegro in the FIBA European Championship for Junior Men.  After a standout career there, he was signed by Ohio State. During his freshman year, he was one of the top contributors off the bench in the Buckeyes' run to the 1999 Final Four. He missed most of the 1999–2000 season due to ankle and leg injuries, but was a starter the next two years. A deadly three-point shooter, he left Ohio State fifth all-time in career three-pointers with 125.

Scandal at Ohio State
Two years after Savović left Ohio State, he played a role in a scandal that ended the career of Buckeyes coach Jim O'Brien. In June 2004, Kathleen Salyers, a nanny from the Columbus suburb of Gahanna, sued Ohio State boosters Dan and Kim Roslovic. Salyers claimed that the Roslovics agreed to pay Salyers $1,000 per month plus expenses to care for Savović. Salyers claimed the Roslovics reneged on that agreement. Savović couldn't live with the Roslovics due to their status as Ohio State boosters.
Salyers also alleged that O'Brien not only knew about these arrangements, but also knew Savović was receiving improper payments and that she did much of Savović's homework for three years because of his difficulties with English.

O'Brien had been fired due to a separate revelation by Salyers that he'd given $6,000 to one-time recruit Aleksandar Radojević. However, the revelations about Savović led to a separate NCAA investigation. Ultimately, Ohio State was placed on three years' probation and forced to vacate every game in which Savović played (including the 1999 Final Four).

Professional career
After going undrafted in the 2002 NBA Draft, he played professionally for four years in Serbia and France.

Personal life
He is the younger brother of former Denver Nuggets player Predrag Savović.

References

External links
 2002 NBA draft profile

1979 births
Living people
East Side High School (Newark, New Jersey) alumni
KK Partizan players
KK Teodo Tivat coaches
NCAA sanctions
Ohio State Buckeyes men's basketball players
Basketball players from Newark, New Jersey
Montenegrin basketball coaches
Montenegrin expatriate basketball people in Serbia
Montenegrin expatriate basketball people in Kosovo
Montenegrin expatriate basketball people in the United States
Montenegrin men's basketball players
Serbian expatriate basketball people in the United States
Serbian expatriate basketball people in France
Serbian men's basketball coaches
Serbian men's basketball players
Serbs of Croatia
Shooting guards
Basketball players from Šibenik